Kotna Rural LLG is a local-level government (LLG) of Western Highlands Province, Papua New Guinea.

Wards
35. Nunga 2
37. Keremunga
38. Romonga
41. Keya
43. Bengel
44. Kembuki
45. Kurunga
46. Rang
48. Rulna
49. Minjim
50. Kentkina
51. Rombanga

References

Local-level governments of Western Highlands Province